Suha (also Romanized as Sūhā) is a village in Vilkij-e Markazi Rural District of Vilkij District, Namin County, Ardabil province, Iran. At the 2006 census, its population was 1,783 in 345 households. The following census in 2011 counted 1,879 people in 477 households. The latest census in 2016 showed a population of 1,958 people in 582 households; it was the largest village in its rural district.

References 

Namin County

Towns and villages in Namin County

Populated places in Ardabil Province

Populated places in Namin County